The Marine Engineering and Research Institute (MERI), formerly known as the Directorate of Marine Engineering Training (DMET), now known as Indian Maritime University - Kolkata Campus and Mumbai Port Campus, is India's national institute and one of the institutes for the training of Marine Engineers and Polyvalent Officers.

History
Marine engineering training in India had its beginning in 1927 on board the training ship Dufferin. Eight years prior, the first Indian owned vessel, the S.S. Loyalty sailed out of Bombay Harbour on April 5, 1919 for London. The vessel was owned by M/S. Scindia Steam Navigation Company. The Master and the other officers were British. Subsequently, Sir P. S. Sivaswamy Iyer, KCSI, CIE moved a resolution in the Indian Legislature to train Indians for the merchant marine. The R.I.M.S. Dufferin was acquired by the Department of Commerce and commissioned as a training ship.

In November 1927, the first batch of 50 nautical cadets joined the I.M.M.T.S. Dufferin under the command of Capt. Superintendent Sir Henry Digby Beste. In 1935, training of engineering cadets commenced on the Dufferin with each batch consisting of 25 nautical and 25 engineering cadets.

Some famous graduates were Capt. M. J. Sayeed of NOL, Vice Admiral R. D. Katari, India's first Indian Chief of Naval Staff, DMET's founding Deputy Directors S. Kasthuri (who later went on to head INS Shivaji and Cochin Shipyard) and T.K.T. Srisailam At least eight of the Dufferin's graduates rose to be admirals. Many of the graduates rose to be the Principal Examiner of Engineers and the Chief Surveyor to the Government of India. At least one, K. Ramakrishna, was appointed as the Principal Examiner of Engineers at the Department of Trade, UK.

In 1947, the newly independent country's founders foresaw the need for an up-to-date Merchant Marine. Article 246 of the Seventh Schedule of the Constitution of India mandates that the Indian Union has jurisdiction and the responsibility for "Maritime shipping and navigation, including shipping and navigation on tidal waters; provision of education and training for the mercantile marine and regulation of such education and training provided by States and other agencies."

On the recommendation of the Merchant Navy Officers Training Committee, constituted in 1947 by the Government of India, the function of pre-sea training of marine engineers was transferred ashore under a new name. The Directorate of Marine Engineering Training (DMET) began operations on August 10, 1949, in temporary facilities in Boribunder in Bombay, and Gorachand Road in Park Circus, Calcutta, with a total intake of 50 students (20 at Bombay and 30 at Calcutta). The institute moved into new facilities in Taratala Road in 1953 and Lower Parel in 1966.

The new building in Calcutta was inaugurated as the Marine Engineering College on December 14, 1953 by Prime Minister Jawaharlal Nehru, with the Transport Minister Lal Bahadur Shastri in attendance. J.S.H. Stephenson assumed Directorship in Calcutta. S. Kasthuri was Deputy Director at Calcutta and T.K.T. Srisailam was appointed Deputy Director at Bombay. K.S. Subramaniam, Motee L. Jagtianie and B.D. Merchant were appointed as officers in the Calcutta branch.

Students trained at marine workshops during the day and attended classes by at night for the three years of the program. The fourth year was devoted fully to classroom instruction at Calcutta. In August 1958, the intake was increased to 60 students and to 100 in the subsequent year. In 1962, an all-India entrance examination was introduced to streamline the standard of the incoming class. In 1982, the Institute of Engineers (India) started recognizing DMET graduates with a First Class (Motor or Steam) licence as equivalent to a graduate engineer, with the right to be called a Chartered Engineer and use "C. Eng (I)" after their names.

In 1975, the Indian shipping industry for the first time felt the requirement for graduate mechanical engineers. Since then, graduate mechanical engineers from institutions like NITs, Punjab Engineering College (PEC), UIET (Chandigarh), College of Engineering Pune and state government colleges have been passing out from MERI (DMET), Bombay. Initially, the course was for six months and was named as Post-Graduate Course in Marine Engineering issued by Govt. of India. Later the course gained its recognition as Post-Graduate Diploma in Marine Engineering (PGDME) issued by IMU.

In 1977–78, an expert committee nominated by the government of India, headed by Prof. Shankar Lal, ex-Director of IIT Kharagpur, recommended changes in the DMET course curriculum, mainly pertaining to class contact hours and practical training. The incorporation of these changes led to the recognition of the graduation certificate of the four-year course at DMET, as being equivalent to a first degree in Marine  Engineering, by the Government of India, starting in 1983.

As part of a revamp of the marine engineering training process in India, in October 1991, the government of India appointed a Committee on Maritime Education and Training (COMET), under the chairmanship of Dr. Chandrika Prasad Srivastava, ex-Secretary General of  International Maritime Organization, to study the status of all maritime training institutes in the country and present recommendations. Based on COMET's findings, the Merchant Marine Education and Research Trust (MMERT) was formed with the assistance of ship  owners' associations, as a first step towards the formation of an Indian Maritime University, to supervise and control maritime education at Indian institutes. In 2001, MERI (Mumbai) launched a dual-degree course in Maritime Science, with admissions through IIT-JEE Extension List.

The Indian marine engineer became synonymous with DMET. Almost every major shipping company in the world has at least one DMETian in its onshore management personnel or floating staff. Many of the world's largest vessels, the ULCCs, are manned by Indian marine engineers. DMET graduates went on to found marine engineering workshops, build companies, found maritime training institutes, develop surveying standards, and pursue careers in management.

The four government-owned maritime institutes – LBS CAMSAR Mumbai, TS Chanakya, Navi Mumbai, MERI Kolkata, and MERI Mumbai – were integrated under the auspices of the Indian Maritime University in 2008.

DMET/MERI celebrated its Diamond Jubilee on 14 December 2010.

Training
MERI has a workshop with machinery, equipment, steam engine and a diesel engine (Kawasaki-MAN, 6000 BHP) for training and to meet IMO and AICTE requirements. Students visit marine workshops for on the job training. Laboratories are provided for cadets/students to conduct practical experiments. Class rooms and teaching aids are in compliance with AICTE requirements.

A new establishment for the training of cadets in basic firefighting is being set up in the campus and is projected to near completion soon.
 
IMU Kolkata Campus now holds the honor of having a humongous working steam reciprocating engine by the efforts of the cadets and the workshop faculty itself who have restored the previously idle engine. It receives steam from a CT Package boiler, or a Foster Wheeler boiler that is independently fired and is capable of superheating the steam.

The Ministry of Education and Culture accorded approval to the graduation certificate issued by the institution as being equivalent to a bachelor's degree in Marine Engineering with effect from 1980–1983 course for the purpose of recruitment to  posts under the Central Government.

The Graduation certificate issued by the institution received  recognition from the Institution of Engineers (India) as an exempting qualification from their A and B examinations from 1982 onwards.

The course has the approval of AICTE.

In order to meet the IMO requirements for marine engineers working on board ship the training curriculum has been oriented to comply with the requirements of the STCW 95 convention.

For quality accreditation, the institute is a certified ISO-9001 institute. It complies with the Indian Government's Right to Information Act.

Admissions
There are 246 seats available in MERI, Kolkata for admission into B.Tech. in Marine Engineering. MERI, Mumbai provides 80 seats for admission into B.Tech. Marine Engineering and 40 seats for B.sc Maritime Science (BMS). 120 seats are available in TS Chanakya, Navi Mumbai for admission in B.Sc. Nautical science. 10 seats are reserved for foreign nationals in TS Chanakya, MERI, Kolkata and MERI, Mumbai. Of the remainder, 15% are reserved for SC and 7-1/2% for ST. Admission is made through the prestigious IIT JEE, conducted by Indian Institutes of Technology.

120 seats for PGDME entry at MERI, Mumbai are through sponsorship from foreign shipping companies and Indian shipping companies including the Shipping Corporation Of India.

Candidates have 10+2 with Physics, Chemistry and Mathematics and with a minimum age as mentioned in the prospectus with relaxation of five years for SC/ST candidates.

Infrastructure

Laboratories include Mechanical Lab, Hydraulic Lab, Heat Lab, Electronics Lab, Electrical Lab, Control Lab, Boiler Lab, Computer Lab, Marpol Lab, Fire Fighting Lab, Simulation Lab, and Seamanship Lab.
There are 9 hostels for B.tech cadets and MBA and M.tech students.

1.Junior Hostel for 1st year cadets.

2.New Junior Hostel (under construction).

3. East wing for 2nd Year cadets.

4. West wing for 2nd Year cadets.

5.Outer Block Complex (OBC hostel) for 3rd Year cadets.

6.L-wing for Final Year cadets.

7.Senior hostel for Final year cadets.

8. Girls Hostel for Lady Cadets.

9.M.tech MBA hostel.

The institute has a technical library, stocked with books, journals, videos, and periodicals.

The workshop has a test rig, Allen 2-stroke engine, Yanmar engines, and working models of ship machinery and components.

Residence in the hostel is compulsory and in dormitories for men and women.

Cadets wear uniforms throughout their period of training.

Notable alumni
Ranjit Singh, CEO Essar Shipping.
 P.K. Banerjee, CEO and Country Manager, M/s Lloyd's Register of Shipping (India and Sri Lanka)
 Sanjay Dixit, Officer of the Indian Administrative Service in the rank of Addl. Secretary, GOI; Principal Secretary to Govt. of Rajasthan, Command Area Development Dept.; Secretary General, Rajasthan Cricket Association; member, Finance Committee, BCCI
 Yatin Gangla, COO of Thome Group
 Hemant Singh Pathania, Managing Director, COO of NYK Ship Management. Corporate Officer of NYK Line.
 A.K. Gupta, Chairman Managing Director, The Shipping Corporation of India
 S. K. Gupta, Global Vice President of Operations for Lockheed Martin Space Systems Company (SSC)
 Ravi Kumar Mehrotra (1964, DMET), marine engineer; rose through the ranks at the Shipping Corporation of India; he established Foresight Limited in London in 1984; was awarded Honorary CBE (Commander of the Order of the British Empire) by Her Majesty Queen Elizabeth II in 2006; established the shuttle service for the export of Iranian oil during the Iran/Iraq War, shuttling 2.2 million barrels per day; developed a fleet of ships trading internationally; member of Lloyds Registry Shipping Committee; is on the committees of DNV UK and American Bureau of Shipping
 Ehsan Mesbahi (1988, DMET-MERI), has served on the United Nations' Marine Environmental Protection Committee; strategic advisor to governments and universities for development of their research, academic and global policies and implementation plans; Dean and Chief Executive Officer (CEO) of Newcastle University International Singapore; founder and director of Newcastle University Marine International
 Bala Subramaniam (1963, DMET Kolkata), graduated in Naval Architecture, Ship Building and Ship Management from MIT, Boston, USA; retired from active service of the Adani Group where he served as Executive Director of Adani Shipping Pte Ltd.; served the United Nations for 23 years as a Principal Adviser to the Secretary General of UNCTAD and Senior Maritime Specialist (ILO and World Bank)
 B.S. Teeka, started his sailing career in 1979 with the Shipping Corporation of India as a junior engineer; founded the Executive Group of companies in 1998 and has since overseen its growth into an organization that has 12 offices worldwide, employing over 6000 seagoing and shore personnel

See also 
 List of maritime colleges
 World Maritime University
 Naval architecture
 Marine propulsion
 Indian Institute of Technology

External links

References 

Engineering colleges in Kolkata
Educational institutions established in 1949
Maritime colleges in India
1949 establishments in India
Engineering colleges in Mumbai